Sammy Gutiérrez (born 31 December 1985), is a Mexican professional boxer in the Strawweight division. Guty was born in San Martín Texmelucan de Labastida, Puebla, Mexico.  On October 23, 2010, he became the interim WBA Minimumweight champion by beating Colombian Luis Carrillo by 3rd-round TKO.

References

External links

|-

1985 births
Living people
Boxers from Puebla
World Boxing Association champions
Mini-flyweight boxers
World mini-flyweight boxing champions
Mexican male boxers